The black-tufted gerbil (Gerbillus famulus) is distributed mainly across the southwestern Arabian Peninsula.

References

Gerbillus
Rodents of Asia
Mammals described in 1895
Taxa named by Oldfield Thomas